is a Japanese manga series written and illustrated by Junji Ito. It was serialized in Big Comic Spirits from September 2004 to July 2005, and published in one volume.

Plot
Following the discovery of a mysterious rogue planet which is on a course towards the solar system, Remina Oguro, the daughter of the scientist who discovered it, finds herself the subject of fame and adoration after her father chooses to name the planet after her. However, as it becomes clear that Remina is on a collision course with Earth, and also appears to be destroying anything in its path, this adoration turns to fear, then to homicidal madness. Eventually, Planet Remina draws near to Earth, and the truth is revealed; rather than an inanimate planet, Remina is a planet-sized organism, intent on tormenting humanity before consuming the Earth whole. Staring down death at every turn with only an enigmatic homeless man as her ally, Remina must flee from the rest of humankind and fight for her survival after she escapes a crucifixion by the mob that kills her father, led by a malevolent cult who believe that sacrificing Remina will bring about an end to the cataclysm enacted by her eponym.

Publication
The series is written and illustrated by Junji Ito. It was serialized in Big Comic Spirits from September 16, 2004 to July 24, 2005. Shogakukan published the series in a single tankōbon volume, which was released in Japan on June 22, 2015.

In 2020, Viz Media announced they licensed the series for English publication. They released the volume on December 15, 2020.

Reception
Nick Smith from ICv2 praised the series, stating it was "handled well". Helen Chazan from The Comics Journal also praised the series, calling it "immensely appealing" and "relatable". Ian Wolf from Anime UK News also praised the series, stating that it felt like something new from Ito, while also giving the horror he is known for. Michelle Smith from Manga Bookshelf was more critical, stating that she was intrigued by the premise, but found the series to be "unaffecting". As part of Anime News Network's Fall 2020 manga guide, Rebecca Silverman and Caitlin Moore reviewed the series. Silverman praised the series, calling it a "good, chilling story", while criticizing it for being "too on the nose with its imagery". Moore stated that she also enjoyed the series, but was left confused by the plot.

In December 2020, the series ranked in the top ten of the adult graphic novels in the United States list by The NPD Group. It also ranked on the top ten of The New York Times Best Sellers list in the graphic books and manga category in January 2021. In the same year, the series won the Eisner Award for Best U.S. Edition of International Material—Asia and was nominated for the Harvey Award. In 2022, it was ranked in the top ten graphic novels by the American Library Association's Graphic Novels and Comics Round Table.

References

External links
 

Eisner Award winners
Horror anime and manga
Science fiction anime and manga
Apocalyptic anime and manga
Seinen manga
Shogakukan manga
Viz Media manga